Sir William Godolphin, 1st Baronet (c. 1640 – 27 August 1710), of Godolphin in Cornwall, was an English land owner, politician, and Member of Parliament. He was the eldest son of Sir Francis Godolphin, KB, who had been a Member of Parliament until being barred from sitting because of his Royalist sympathies during the Civil War, and who after the Restoration was knighted in reward for his loyalty. Probably also in token of Sir Francis's services, William was created a baronet on 29 April 1661.

He represented the family borough of Helston in Parliament from 1665 until 1679, but his career was overshadowed by that of his younger brother, Sidney, who rose to be First Lord of the Treasury and was granted a peerage and later an earldom; another brother, Henry, took holy orders and ended as Dean of St Paul's and Provost of Eton. Sir William died unmarried, and the family estates passed to his brother.

References
 
 Burke's Extinct Peerage (London: Henry Colburn & Richard Bentley, 1831) 
D. Brunton & D. H. Pennington, Members of the Long Parliament (London: George Allen & Unwin, 1954)

|-

1640s births
1710 deaths
Baronets in the Baronetage of England
English MPs 1661–1679
Year of birth uncertain
Members of the pre-1707 English Parliament for constituencies in Cornwall
People from Breage, Cornwall
William
Governors of the Isles of Scilly